Hickory Signals are a Brighton-based folk duo consisting of Laura Ward and Adam Ronchetti. Aside from their work as a duo, they are both full-time members of Brighton folk collective Bird in the Belly.

History

Noise of the Waters EP

In late 2016 the Hickory Signals independently released their second EP, titled Noise of the Waters. The title of the EP and the lyrics for the lead single were taken from the poem of the same name by James Joyce, and was chosen by the duo as it mirrored their experiences of living on a house boat. The EP was produced by Ian Carter from Stick in the Wheel.

Laura Ward was selected to interview Peggy Seeger about her life and autobiography on stage for the Shoreham Ropetackle Arts Centre

Turn to Fray

In 2018, the band announced their debut album Turn to Fray would be released on GFM Records.

"Turn to Fray" was released on 16 November 2018, and was met with critical acclaim. :The Guardian praised the album for its progressive approach to gender politics within the folk genre, and made it Folk Album of the Month

With Bird in the Belly 

In late 2016, folk musician Jinnwoo announced he was working with Hickory Signals in a new folk collective called Bird in the Belly. Bird in the Belly stated their objective as a band was to uncover forgotten or overlooked British songs, stories, and poems, and reintroduce them into the current folk music canon.

Bird in the Belly released their debut album, The Crowing, on 23 March 2018, through a partnership between GFM Records and Proper Music Distribution. The album received critical acclaim, and was made "Album of the Week" in the Daily Express who called it "Folk album of the year so far".

Discography

EPs

Albums

Albums with Bird in the Belly

References

External links
Official website

21st-century British artists
English folk musical groups
Living people
Musical groups from Brighton and Hove
Year of birth missing (living people)